Lôh-Djiboua Region is one of the 31 regions of Ivory Coast. Since its creation in 2011, it has been one of two regions in Gôh-Djiboua District. The regional seat is Divo and the region's area is 10,650 km². At the 2021 census, the region had a population of 1,103,158.

History
Lôh-Djiboua Region was created as part of the 2011 reorganisation of the subdivisions of Ivory Coast. Prior to this, the territory that is now Lôh-Djiboua constituted the majority of the first-level division Sud-Bandama Region, which also included what is now Fresco Department. At the reorganisation, the territory of Fresco Department was transferred to Bas-Sassandra District and the remainder of Sud-Bandama became the second-level division Lôh-Djiboua. Lôh-Djiboua was combined with Gôh Region to form the new first-level division Gôh-Djiboua District.

Departments
Lôh-Djiboua is currently divided into three departments: Divo, Guitry, and Lakota.

Notes

 
Regions of Gôh-Djiboua District
2011 establishments in Ivory Coast
States and territories established in 2011